Bert Manderson (9 May 1893 – 27 April 1946) was an Irish footballer, who played for Rangers and Ireland.

Playing career
Manderson, a right-back, made his Rangers debut in a 1-1 draw with Aberdeen on 27 March 1915. He had joined Rangers from Glenavon for £150. He previously had spells at Cliftonville and Belfast Celtic. He went on to make 370 league appearances (452 in total) in 12 seasons with the club, winning seven Scottish league titles. Manderson left Rangers to join Bradford Park Avenue in 1927.

He was also capped at international level by Ireland.

Coaching career
Manderson was trainer of Queen's Park from at least 1929 until his death. He died on 27 April 1946, aged 52.

References

External links

1893 births
1946 deaths
Belfast Celtic F.C. players
Cliftonville F.C. players
Glenavon F.C. players
Irish association footballers (before 1923)
Association footballers from Northern Ireland
Association footballers from Belfast

Pre-1950 IFA international footballers
Rangers F.C. players
NIFL Premiership players
Bradford (Park Avenue) A.F.C. players
Association football fullbacks
Queen's Park F.C. managers
Scottish Football League managers
Football managers from Northern Ireland